Lake Khanka is a freshwater lake located on the border between Primorsky Krai, Russia and Heilongjiang province, China

Khanka may also refer to:

 Eslamabad-e Darvish Khanka, a village in Golashkerd Rural District, in the Central District of Faryab County, Kerman Province, Iran
 Khanka spiny bitterling (Acanthorhodeus chankaensis), a temperate freshwater fish belonging to the subfamily Acheilognathinae of the family Cyprinidae
 Xonqa (AKA Khanka, anglicisation of Russian Ханка), a town in Xorazm Region in Uzbekistan, chief town in Xonqa District
 Khanke, a village in Iraq
 Khanka, a city in Qalyubia Governorate, Egypt
 khanaqah, a type of building

See also 
 Kanka (disambiguation)